John Putnam Merrill (March 10, 1917 – April 14, 1984) was an American physician and medical researcher. He led the team which performed the world's first successful kidney transplant.  He generally credited as the "father of nephrology" or "the founder of nephrology," which is the scientific study of the kidney and its diseases.

Early life
Merrill was born in 1917 in Hartford, Connecticut. After graduating from Dartmouth College in 1938, he attended the Harvard Medical School.  He graduated in 1942; and he was an intern at the Peter Bent Brigham Hospital.

During World War II, he served for four years in the Army. Two years were spent on Kwajalein Island in the Pacific with "Operation Crossroads."

Career
Merrill's entire career was spent in Boston at Peter Bent Brigham Hospital, now known as Brigham and Women's Hospital.  His work as a medical researcher began in 1947.  As a resident in medicine, he was assigned to head the team which developed an artificial kidney (the Brigham-Kolff dialyzers) for use in the treatment of acute and chronic kidney failure.

In 1950, Merrill began teaching at Harvard Medical School.

In 1954, Merrill headed the multidisciplinary team that performed the first successful transplant of a kidney between identical twin brothers.

Merrill was made a full professor at Harvard Medical School in 1970. His legacy is found in his students and in those doctors he mentored.

Chronology

Merrill's career was cut short when he died on April 14, 1984, in a boating accident while vacationing in the Bahamas.

Selected works
In a statistical overview derived from writings by and about John Merrill, OCLC/WorldCat encompasses roughly 20+ works in 30+ publications in 3 languages and 400+ library holdings .

 1980 – The role of the kidney in human hypertension.
 1980 – Factors Influencing Renal Vasculature During Anesthesia, Trauma, and Oliguric Renal Failure States in Man
 1977 – Electrolyte Imbalance
 1974 – Present Status of Kidney Transplantation
 1973 – Topics in Nephrology
 1973 – Squirrel Island, Maine: the First Hundred Years
 1971 – Uremia; Progress in Pathophysiology and Treatment
 1971 – Artificial Organs and Cardiopulmonary Support Systems
 1969 – Treatment of acute renal failure
 1967 – Il trattamento dell'insufficienza renale
 1963 – Reversible Renal Failure
 1959 – Die Behandlung der Niereninsuffizienz therapeutische Grundlagen der Behandlung akuter und chronischer Urämie unter besonderer Berücksichtigung des Elektrolythaushaltes
 1959 – Die Behandlung der Niereninsuffienz (The Treatment of Renal Failure)
 1955 – The Treatment of Renal Failure; Therapeutic Principles in the Management of Acute and Chronic Uremia

Honors
 Gairdner Foundation International Award, 1969
 American Society for Clinical Investigation, president, 1963

Notes

     8.  Dept of Veterans Affairs BIRLS Death File

References
 Fenster, Julie M. (2003).  Mavericks, Miracles, and Medicine: The Pioneers Who Risked Their Lives to Bring Medicine Into the Modern Age. New York: Carroll & Graf Publishers. ; ; OCLC 52825127
 Friedman, Eli A. (1978). The John P. Merrill Festschrift: nephrological research papers by past and present members of the Merrill School of Nephrology. New York: Karger. OCLC 10230217
 Thorn, George W. (1973). Essays in Medicine: Topics in Nephrology. New York: Medcom Communications Group.

Dartmouth College alumni
Harvard Medical School alumni
American medical researchers
Harvard Medical School faculty
American nephrologists
1917 births
1984 deaths
Howard Hughes Medical Investigators
20th-century American physicians